The 2008 Fresno State football team (variously "Fresno State" or "the 'Dogs") represented California State University, Fresno in the 2008 NCAA Division I FBS football season. The team was coached by 12th-year head coach Pat Hill, who had a contract lasting through the 2010 season. This season was the Bulldogs' 28th in their current home of Bulldog Stadium in Fresno, California.

Preseason 
The Bulldogs has enjoyed success as one of the most highly regarded BCS non-AQ conference schools in the country in the previous decade. The 2007 team finished with 9 wins, 4 losses, including a victory in the 2007 Humanitarian Bowl. The annual spring game for the 2008 season took place on April 18, and the Bulldogs concluded spring drills on April 21.

Going into the summer, the Bulldogs already began to draw attention to their team in the post-spring preseason polls released by sports pundits, drawn to the large number of returning starters, along with the impressive finish, beating the Georgia Tech in the 2007 Humanitarian Bowl to finish the season with a record of 9-4. Athlon has released their preseason 25 poll with the Bulldogs listed ranked #25; Dennis Dodd of CBS Sportsline has ranked the team at #24; and Mark Schlabach of ESPN placed the Bulldogs in the #21 spot.

At the end of the 2007 season, former offensive coordinator Jim McElwain resigned to accept the coaching position of offensive coordinator at Alabama, replacing former Texas Longhorn Major Applewhite.  On February 28, 2008, Fresno State announced the hire of Doug Nussmeier as the Offensive Coordinator at Fresno State.

Personnel

Coaching staff

Roster

Depth chart

Schedule

Game summaries

at Rutgers

No. 10 Wisconsin

at Toledo

at UCLA 

1-6 all time. Last meeting in 2003. (17-9 in San Jose in the Silicon Valley Bowl)
A Derrick Coleman fumble in the redzone in the fourth quarter took away the Bruins' hope of keeping the Bulldogs from winning a game in the Rose Bowl stadium. Fresno State won its first game there by five points, taking control of the final 8 minutes and 55 seconds and not allowing a UCLA comeback.

Hawaii

Idaho

at Utah State

at Louisiana Tech

Nevada

New Mexico State

at San Jose State

at No. 9 Boise State

vs. Colorado State (New Mexico Bowl)

Awards

First Team All WAC 
Bobby Lepori- Sr. OL

Second Team All WAC 
Bear Pascoe- Sr. TE- 2007 1st team

Chris Carter- So. LB

Ben Jacobs-So. LB

Moses Harris- Jr. DB

References

Fresno State
Fresno State Bulldogs football seasons
Fresno State Bulldogs football